Wojciech Orłowski (born October 14, 1981, in Racibórz) is Polish wrestler and mixed martial artist.

Mixed martial arts record

|-
| Loss
| align=center| 7-9 (1)
| Adam Kowalski
| TKO (head kick and punches)
| Granda Pro 7: Lucky 7
| 
| align=center| 1
| align=center| 2:07
| Warsaw, Poland
| 
|-
| Win
| align=center| 7-8 (1)
| Wojciech Balejko
| Decision (unanimous)
| PLMMA 72: Lomianki
| 
| align=center| 3
| align=center| 5:00
| Lomianki, Poland
| 
|-
| Loss
| align=center| 6-8 (1)
| Dawid Drobina
| Submission (heel hook)
| PLMMA 70: Championship Torwar
| 
| align=center| 2
| align=center| N/A
| Warsaw, Poland
| 
|-
| Win
| align=center| 6-7 (1)
| Pawel Bolanowski
| KO (slam and punches)
| PLMMA 67: Nastula Cup 1
| 
| align=center| 1
| align=center| 0:20
| Lomianki, Poland
| 
|-
| Win
| align=center| 5-7 (1)
| Krzysztof Pietraszek
| Submission (rear-naked choke)
| ACB 29: Poland 
| 
| align=center| 1
| align=center| 2:59
| Warsaw, Poland
| 
|-
| Win
| align=center| 4-7 (1)
| Jordi Vinyals
| TKO (punches)
| Ansgar Fighting League 7: Barcelona
| 
| align=center| 1
| align=center| 1:17
| Barcelona, Spain
| 
|-
| NC
| align=center| 3-7 (1)
| Daniel Palomo Diaz
| NC (accidental headbutt)
| Cagemania 6
| 
| align=center| 1
| align=center| 4:00
| Mijas, Spain
| 
|-
| Loss
| align=center| 3-7
| Grzegorz Cieplinski
| TKO (knee injury)
| Battle of Champions
| 
| align=center| 1
| align=center| 0:15
| Zamosc, Poland
| 
|-
| Loss
| align=center| 3-6
| Michal Pasternak
| TKO (punches)
| PLMMA 10: 2012 Final
| 
| align=center| 1
| align=center| 3:34
| Warsaw, Poland
| 
|-
| Loss
| align=center| 3-5
| Wojciech Antczak
| TKO (punches)
| Fight CUp: Battle of Warsaw
| 
| align=center| 1
| align=center| 3:42
| Warsaw, Poland
| 
|-
| Loss
| align=center| 3-4
| Matteo Minonzio
| TKO (punches)
| KSW Fight Club
| 
| align=center| 2
| align=center| 0:36
| Ryn, Poland
| 
|-
| Loss
| align=center| 3-3
| Jan Błachowicz
| Submission (rear-naked choke)
| KSW 13: Kumite
| 
| align=center| 1
| align=center| 1:37
| Katowice, Poland
| 
|-
| Win
| align=center| 3-2
| Tomasz Molski
| TKO (punches)
| KSW 13: Kumite
| 
| align=center| 1
| align=center| 1:07
| Katowice, Poland
| 
|-
| Loss
| align=center| 2-2
| David Oliva
| TKO (submission to punches)
| KSW 12: Pudzianowski vs. Najman
| 
| align=center| 1
| align=center| 2:51
| Warsaw, Poland
| 
|-
| Win
| align=center| 2-1
| Maciej Marczewski
| TKO (punches)
| Maximus 1
| 
| align=center| 1
| align=center| 3:18
| Szczecinek, Poland
| 
|-
| Win
| align=center| 1-1
| Arkadiusz Jedraczka
| Decision (unanimous)
| Maxxx Fight: Fight to Win
| 
| align=center| 2
| align=center| 5:00
| Warsaw, Poland
| 
|-
| Loss
| align=center| 0-1
| Florian Muller
| Submission 
| Fight Club Berlin 9
| 
| align=center| 1
| align=center| 3:41
| Berlin, Germany
|

External links 
 Professional MMA record of Wojciech Orłowski by sherdog.com

1981 births
Living people
People from Racibórz
Polish male sport wrestlers
Sportspeople from Silesian Voivodeship